Tostado is a Spanish word meaning "toasted". In Ecuador, tostado refers to a fried type of corn grains.

Related concepts include:

 Alonso Tostado, Spanish erudite
 Almudena Cid Tostado, Spanish gymnast
 Edmundo Martínez Tostado, better known as Don Tosti, American musician
 Tostado, Santa Fe, Argentina
 Tostado, sandwiches in Argentina

See also
Tostada (disambiguation), several kinds of food